J.G. Morgan was the manager and secretary of Coventry City, then known as Singers FC, from 1887 to 1893.

Coventry City F.C. managers
Year of birth missing